The 1955–56 season was Newport County's 28th season in the Football League and ninth consecutive season in the Third Division South since relegation from the Second Division at the end of the 1946–47 season.

Season review

Results summary

Results by round

Fixtures and results

Third Division South

FA Cup

Welsh Cup

League table

P = Matches played; W = Matches won; D = Matches drawn; L = Matches lost; F = Goals for; A = Goals against; GA = Goal average; Pts = Points

External links
 Newport County 1955-1956 : Results
 Newport County football club match record: 1956
 Welsh Cup 1955/56

References

1955-56
English football clubs 1955–56 season
1955–56 in Welsh football